Hotel Lincoln, also known as the General Francis Marion Hotel and Lincoln Inn, is a historic hotel building located at Marion, Smyth County, Virginia. It was built in 1926–1927, and is a five-story, Colonial Revival style reinforced concrete commercial building. The upper floors are faced with Kingsport velveteen brick.  The third through fifth floors are "U" shaped and contain 19 guestrooms and 13 bathrooms per floor.  It is one of the last remaining early-20th-century hotel buildings in Southwest Virginia.  In addition to providing accommodations, the hotel offered space for public and private meetings, receptions, and dances. The building also contained a drugstore, coffee shop, beauty salon, and barber shop.

It was listed on the National Register of Historic Places in 1995. It is located in the Marion Historic District.

References

External links
General Francis Marion Hotel website

Hotel buildings on the National Register of Historic Places in Virginia
Colonial Revival architecture in Virginia
Hotel buildings completed in 1927
Buildings and structures in Smyth County, Virginia
National Register of Historic Places in Smyth County, Virginia
Individually listed contributing properties to historic districts on the National Register in Virginia